Kirkor Kirkorov (born March 4, 1968, as Krikor Kirkorian) is a retired boxer from Bulgaria, who competed for his native country at the 1992 Summer Olympics in Barcelona, Spain. There he was defeated in the first round of the Men's Featherweight Division (– 57 kg) by Germany's eventual gold medalist Andreas Tews.

Kirkorov also competed at the 1988 Summer Olympics, reaching the third round before falling to South Korea's Lee Jae-Hyuk. He won the world title in his weight division in 1991, after having claimed the silver medal two years earlier in Moscow.

He is of Armenian descent.

References

 

1968 births
Living people
Bulgarian male boxers
Featherweight boxers
Boxers at the 1988 Summer Olympics
Boxers at the 1992 Summer Olympics
Olympic boxers of Bulgaria
Sportspeople from Varna, Bulgaria
Bulgarian people of Armenian descent
Armenian male boxers
AIBA World Boxing Championships medalists